Trevor Thornton Crowe (born November 17, 1983) is a former American professional baseball outfielder. He has played in Major League Baseball for the Cleveland Indians and Houston Astros. Prior to playing professionally, Crowe attended the University of Arizona, where he played college baseball for the Arizona Wildcats.

Amateur career
Crowe attended Westview High School, and was selected by the Oakland Athletics in the 20th round of the 2002 Major League Baseball Draft. Crowe did not sign with the Athletics, instead enrolled at the University of Arizona, where he played college baseball for the Arizona Wildcats baseball team. In 2003, he played collegiate summer baseball in the Cape Cod Baseball League for the Yarmouth-Dennis Red Sox, and was the starting left-fielder for the East division in the league's annual all-star game. Crowe was named the 2005 Pac-10 Conference Co-Player of the Year, with Jacoby Ellsbury.

An all-around athlete, Crowe was a competitive racquetball player in his teenage years and was one of the top players in the nation.

Professional career

Cleveland Indians
The Cleveland Indians selected Crowe in the first round, with the 14th overall selection, in the 2005 Major League Baseball Draft. Crowe was named to the 2006 Carolina League All-Star game, but was unable to participate due to injury. He started the 2007 season as the Akron Aeros starting center fielder. After an unsuccessful experiment at second base beginning in late August 2006, Crowe was moved permanently back to the outfield, rotating between all three outfield positions.

After initially being optioned to the minors on March 28, 2009, Crowe was recalled at the end of Spring Training due to an injury to David Dellucci and was part of the Indians Opening Day roster.

Crowe started as the right fielder for the Indians in his MLB debut on April 9, 2009 against the Texas Rangers at Rangers Ballpark in Arlington. Crowe went 0-for-5 including one strikeout.

Crowe was outrighted to the Triple-A Columbus Clippers on November 2, 2011. He was invited to the Indians 2012 spring training camp as a non-roster invitee on February 15, 2012. He was released by Cleveland on July 16. He is currently represented by Scott Leventhal and All Bases Covered Sports Management.

Los Angeles Angels of Anaheim
Crowe was signed by the Los Angeles Angels on July 17, 2012, and was assigned to Salt Lake Bees.

Houston Astros
Crowe joined the Houston Astros before the 2013 season. He was outrighted off the roster on October 17, 2013.

Detroit Tigers
He signed a minor league deal with the Detroit Tigers in January 2014. On July 20, 2014, Crowe was released by the Detroit Tigers.

Personal life
In 2017, Crowe purchased a $3.2 million home in Phoenix, Arizona.

In December 2020, Crowe was sentenced to three years of probation and ordered to pay $85,043 in restitution to the Internal Revenue Service for omitting more than $300,000 in income from illegal gambling from his 2015 income tax return. At his sentencing, his attorneys argued that he suffered from opioid addiction and mental illness which contributed to his conduct. He was later sentenced to three months of probation.

References

External links

Minor League Splits and Sitautional Stats
Official Website of Trevor Crowe

1983 births
Living people
Major League Baseball outfielders
Cleveland Indians players
Houston Astros players
Arizona Wildcats baseball players
Yarmouth–Dennis Red Sox players
Mahoning Valley Scrappers players
Lake County Captains players
Kinston Indians players
Akron Aeros players
Buffalo Bisons (minor league) players
Arizona League Indians players
Columbus Clippers players
Salt Lake Bees players
Gulf Coast Astros players
Oklahoma City RedHawks players
American racquetball players
Baseball players from Portland, Oregon
Peoria Javelinas players
Surprise Rafters players
All-American college baseball players